Four ships of the Royal Navy have borne the name HMS Searcher:

  was a brigantine built in 1562 and sold in 1564.
  was an  launched in 1918 and sold in 1938.
  was an  launched in 1942 and transferred under lend-lease. She was returned the US Navy in 1945 and sold into mercantile service.
  was a Landing Ship, Tank launched as LST 3508 in 1944, renamed HMS Searcher in 1947 and broken up in 1949.

Royal Navy ship names